Hi, Nellie! is a 1934 American crime drama film directed by Mervyn LeRoy and starring Paul Muni and Glenda Farrell. A newspaper editor is demoted to writing an advice column for refusing to go along with the crowd in declaring a missing lawyer to be a thief.

Plot
Newspaper editor Brad (Paul Muni) learns that Frank J. Canfield, the head of the governor's investigating committee, has disappeared, along with a large sum of money. He refuses to print the story on the front page of the newspaper because there is no proof that Canfield, an honest and prominent lawyer, fled with the missing funds. When every other newspaper in the city features the story, the newspaper's owner Graham (Berton Churchill) reprimands Brad for the missing story and fires him. Brad says that his contract does not allow him to be fired, so Graham decides to make him write the lonely hearts column.

Brad is furious, but has no choice but to accept the position. He also decides to keep an eye on the Frank J. Canfield story. Gerry (Glenda Farrell), the current writer of the column, who also was demoted to the position by Brad, is delighted by the news. When Gerry accuses him of having no guts because he cannot handle the job, Brad puts his skills to work, and the column becomes very popular.

One day, Rosa Marinello comes to the newspaper's office, looking for Nellie Nelson, Brad's pseudonym for the column. She ask Nellie to intervene on her behalf because her undertaker father no longer wants her to marry her fiancé. When Brad learns that Canfield was last seen at the same address where Rosa lives, he agrees to go. Brad finds out that gangster Brownell (Robert Barrat) attended a funeral around the time of Canfield's disappearance. Brad later discovers that Canfield was framed and murdered by his rival. Brad advises Brownell to dig up Canfield's body and transfer it to another grave, and gets a photograph of the body and takes it to his newspaper. Brownell is arrested and tried for murder. Canfield is cleared, and Brad is reinstated as the newspaper's editor.

Cast

 Paul Muni as Brad
 Glenda Farrell as Gerry
 Ned Sparks as Shammy
 Robert Barrat as Brownell
 Berton Churchill as Graham
 Katharine Sergava  as Grace
 Hobart Cavanaugh as Fullerton
 Douglass Dumbrille as Dawes
 Edward Ellis as O'Connell
 Paul Kaye as Helwig
 Donald Meek as Durkin
 John Qualen as Steve (uncredited)

Preservation status
A copy of the film is preserved by the Library of Congress.

Other notes
The story on which the screenplay was based, written by Roy Chanslor, was remade into the movie The House Across the Street, albeit with a different screenwriter, in 1949.

Box office
According to Warner Bros records the film earned $407,000 domestically and $240,000 internationally.

References

External links
 
 
 
 

1934 films
1934 crime drama films
American crime drama films
American black-and-white films
Films about journalists
Films directed by Mervyn LeRoy
Films set in New York City
Warner Bros. films
1930s English-language films
1930s American films
Films scored by Bernhard Kaun
Films about missing people